State Route 116 (SR 116) is a  state highway that runs west-to-east through portions of Harris and Talbot counties in the west-central part of the U.S. state of Georgia.

Route description
SR 116 begins at an intersection with SR 219, west of Hamilton, in Harris County. This intersection also marks the southern terminus of SR 103. Almost immediately is an interchange with Interchange 185 (I-185; Chet Atkins Parkway). In Hamilton is a very brief concurrency with US 27/SR 1 (Old College Street). Northeast of here is Pine Mountain Valley, where the road intersects the southern terminus of SR 354. SR 116 travels to the east into the town of Shiloh. There, it begins a concurrency with US 27 Alternate/SR 85 Alternate to the south. Just southeast of that intersection, the two routes run along the Harris–Talbot county line for a short while. To the south, the two routes meet SR 85 (Warm Springs Road). At this intersection, SR 85 Alternate meets its southern terminus. Also, SR 116 joins US 27 Alternate/SR 85 to the northeast. Immediately, it enters Talbot County. When SR 116 splits from the concurrency, it heads east-northeast. Then, it curves to the northeast just before it meets its eastern terminus, an intersection with SR 41 northwest of Woodland.

SR 116 is not part of the National Highway System, a system of roadways important to the nation's economy, defense, and mobility.

Major intersections

See also

 List of highways numbered 116

References

External links

 Georgia Roads (Routes 101-120)

116
Transportation in Harris County, Georgia
Transportation in Talbot County, Georgia